Vampirovibrio chlorellavorus is a 0.6 µm pleomorphic cocci with a gram negative cell wall, and is one of the few known predatory bacteria. Unlike many bacteria, V. chlorellavorus is an obligate parasite, attaching to the cell wall of green algae of the genus Chlorella. The name Vampirovibrio originates from the Serbian . meaning vampire (due to the nature of sucking out cellular contents of its prey) and vibrio referring to the bacterial genus of curved rod bacterium. Chlorellavorus is named for the algal host of the bacterium (Chlorella) and the Latin  meaning "to devour" (Chlorella-devouring).

Classification
The bacterium, first described by Gromov and Mamkayeva in 1972, was originally classified in the genus Bdellovibrio. It was then reclassified as its own genus Vampirovibrio in 1980 after being excluded from the genus Bdellovibrio for some essential discrepancies. The most significant difference was that members of Bdellovibrio are intracellular parasites, both residing and dividing in the periplasmic space in its host, whereas Vampirovibrio is epibiotic, attaching to the cell wall of green algae in the genus Chlorella. It was also thought that the bacterium utilized a thin, uncovered flagellum for motility. However, it was later discovered that the bacterium was non-motile, further differentiating it from members of Bdellovibrio.

Further research however suggests that the latest classification of V. chlorellavorus is still incorrect. By analyzing the genome of V. chlorellavorus, Soo and Hugenholtz determined that the organism was more accurately a Cyanobacteria rather than a Proteobacteria. Using 16S rRNA analysis, scientists have estimated that this bacterium most closely belongs to the SM1D11 lineage of bacteria, which has now been classified as the order Vampirovibrionales. Vampirovibrio chlorellavorus was formerly regarded as related to the family Bdellovibrionacae, which has been described as Bdellovibrio and like organisms or BALOs. However, when compared to other Cyanobacteria, Vampirovibrio is non-photosynthetic and seems to belong to Melainabacteria, from Greek root words meaning “nymph of dark waters.”. It was later decided that phylum Cyanobacteria, class Melainabacteria, order Vampirovibrionales, and family Vampirovibrionaceae more accurately classified the organism, although Melainabacteria is now described as a phylum in its own right, distinct from Cyanobacteria.

Preliminary Characterization
Vampirovibrio chlorellavorus is a gram-negative obligate aerobic and epibiotic parasitic bacterium with a curved comma shape. The bacterium attaches to the surface of green algae of the genus Chlorella. V. chlorellavorus is an extracellular parasite and remains attached to the cell wall.  Once attached to its host, V. chlorellavorus divides by binary fission, destroying its host in the process by "sucking out" all of the cellular contents via peripheral vacuoles much like a vampire (hence the name Vampirovibrio). V. chlorellavorus leaves behind only the cell wall and cytoplasmic membrane of Chromatium along with a few intracytoplasmic inclusions. V. chlorellavorus will not grow in axenic cultures, depending on access to living cells of its preferred algae host, Chlorella vulgaris for reproduction. The Vampirovibrio life cycle consists of: prey location, attachment, ingestion, binary division, and release.

Discovery and Isolation
Gromov and Mamkaeva first isolated Bdellovibrio chlorellavorus in a lysis experiment with the algae Chlorella vulgaris from Ukrainian reservoir waters from a mass culture of Chlorella Beijer in 1966.

Genomics
Dr. Hugenholtz and colleagues from the University of Queensland in Australia, have completed shotgun sequencing of lyophilized cells of V. chlorellavourus strain  in culture with Chlorella vulgaris.  Subsequently, Soo and Hugenholtz's team performed a genomic reconstruction in 2014 from a culture previously deposited into the NCBI collection in 1978 and were able to make a general metabolic reconstruction of the genome  They found that V. chlorellavorus uses a type IV secretion system (T4SS), similar to that of Agrobacterium tumefaciens for host invasion, which is conserved in all three copies of the V. chlorellavorus genome. To locate its prey, V. chlorellavorus seems to be equipped with possible genes for aerotaxis and light activated kinase (moving towards light), suggesting that it might be motile as was originally thought. To digest its algal prey, V. chlorellavorus has over 100 hydrolytic enzymes including proteases and peptidases. From the results of Soo and her team's genomic analysis, V. chlorellavorus has approximately 26 contigs, 2.91 Mbp, an average GC content of 51.4%, and 2 circular plasmids. In keeping with its description as non-photosynthetic and parasitic microorganism, V. chlorellavorus does not have its own genes for photosynthesis or carbon fixation. V. chlorellavorus is however capable of synthesizing its own nucleotides, certain cofactors and vitamins, and 15 different amino acids. Its bacterial genome also includes coding for a complete glycolysis pathway as well as an electron transport chain.

Research and Implications
Vampirovibrio or Bdellovibrio may be used to help control harmful populations of bacteria due to their predatory nature. In an experiment where Bdellovibrio were added to a shrimp tank to consume populations of bacteria, the target bacterial populations declined by up to 44%. The Bdellovibrio population declined as well after consuming most of the available bacteria. Therefore, use of Bdellovibrio as an inhibitor of other bacteria shows potential, but may be limited to certain cases as Bdellovibrio prefers certain strains, such as gram-negative bacteria. In a subsequent experiment, chickens, highly susceptible to cecal or gut infections, were used in an experiment in which scientists purposely infected chickens with a pathogenic form of Salmonella enterica. The chicken were then exposed to Bdellovibrio bacteriovorus, after which a reduction in inflammation and other harmful changes in the chickens’ ceca were observed as a result of decreased Salmonella populations. The success of this experiment suggest there is significant potential for Bdellovibrio in bioremediation. Since Vampirovibrio chlorellavorus has not been cultured in recent years, it is possible to learn about its future research applications by learning about the methods in which Bdellovibrio and like organisms, or BALOs, are used to control pathogenic bacteria.

References

External links
"Phil Hugenholtz at the 2015 DOE JGI Genomics of Energy & Environment Meeting"
Dr. Hugenholtz' website featuring his current areas of research
Information about V. chlorellavorus by its strain number ATCC 29753
Soo et al., 2015. Back from the dead; the curious tale of the predatory cyanobacterium //Vampirovibrio chlorellavorus//

Bacteria
Parasites of plants